The Troubles in Lurgan recounts incidents during the Troubles in Lurgan, County Armagh, Northern Ireland.

1972
18 June 1972 – Arthur McMillan (37), Ian Mutch (31), Colin Leslie (26), all British Army soldiers, killed in booby trap bomb in derelict house by Provisional Irish Republican Army, Bleary, near Lurgan

1975
27 April 1975 – Joseph Toman (45), John Feeney (45), Brendan O'Hara (40) all Catholics, shot during gun attack on social club, Bleary, near Lurgan by the Protestant Action Force
27 July 1975 - Billy Hanna(46), founder and first commander of the Ulster Volunteer Force's Mid-Ulster Brigade, is shot dead outside his home in the Mourneview estate by members of his own organisation.

1981
17 November 1981 - Peadar Fagan (20), Catholic civilian, killed by the Ulster Volunteer Force in a drive-by shooting on Levin Road.

1982
27 October 1982 – Seán Quinn (37), Catholic, Alan McCloy (34) and Paul Hamilton (26), both Protestants, all members of the Royal Ulster Constabulary (RUC), were killed in a Provisional Irish Republican Army land mine attack on their armoured patrol car at Oxford Island, near Lurgan.
11 November 1982 - Eugene Toman (21), Sean Burns (21) and Gervase McKerr (31), all Catholic members of the Irish Republican Army, shot dead by undercover RUC officers at a vehicle check point, Tullgalley East Road, Craigavon. 109 shots were fired at the car they were travelling in, there was no retaliation.

1983 
2 April 1983 - Seán McConville (22), a Catholic civilian, beaten to death by a loyalist gang as he walked along Lower North Street.
25 November 1983 - Daniel Rouse (51), a Catholic civilian, beaten to death by a loyalist gang as he walked along Old Portadown Road.

1984
27 January 1984 - Daniel McIntyre (28), a Catholic civilian, shot dead by the Ulster Volunteer Force from a passing car as he walked along Manor Drive.

1990
7 January 1990 - Martin Byrne (28), a Catholic civilian, is shot dead in his taxi by the Protestant Action Force at Aghacommon, outside Lurgan.
7 March 1990 - Sam Marshall (31), a member of Sinn Féin, is assassinated by the UVF shortly after leaving the town's Royal Ulster Constabulary station. Two of his companions escaped unharmed.
23 September 1990 - Colin McCullough (22), a member of the Ulster Defence Regiment, is shot dead by the Irish Republican Army at Oxford Island on the outskirts of town.
6 October 1990 - Denis Carville (19), a Catholic civilian, is shot dead by the Ulster Volunteer Force's Mid-Ulster Brigade at Oxford Island on the outskirts of town.
10 November 1990 –  David Murphy (50), Thomas Taylor (49) both Protestant members of the Royal Ulster Constabulary were shot dead alongside Protestant civilians Norman Kendall (44) and Keith Dowey (30) by the Provisional Irish Republican Army at Castor's Bay outside the town.

1993
28 October 1993 – Gerard Cairns (22) and Rory Cairns (18) both Catholics, shot at their home by the Ulster Volunteer Force's Mid-Ulster Brigade, the Slopes, Bleary, near Lurgan.

1997
16 June 1997 – John Graham (34) and David Johnston (30), both Protestant members of the Royal Ulster Constabulary, were shot dead by the Provisional Irish Republican Army, while on foot patrol at Church Walk, Lurgan. The two officers were shot in the head from close range from behind and were the first to be killed by the IRA since the ending of its ceasefire on 9 February 1996. In response the British Government called off further contact with Sinn Féin.

1998
7 July 1998 - The home of Catholic man Seán Dowds (63) and his English Protestant wife Joan Dowds (54) was attacked with petrol bombs after a group of loyalists terrorised the Collingwood housing estate in Lurgan. Both of them survived, however Mr Dowds was rushed to hospital after suffering severe chest pains due to a history of heart attacks. The couple and residents of the Collingwood estate held the Orange Order responsible.

References 

Lurgan
Lurgan